Daniel Mattheus Kotze (born 28 March 1987) is a South African-born French rugby union player. He began his career in South Africa with the Free State Cheetahs before moving to Stade Aurillacois in 2009. He left Stade Aurillacois in 2011 to join ASM Clermont Auvergne. He was selected to play for France in 2013 against the All Blacks. He made his debut for France on 8 June 2013 against New Zealand, in Auckland replacing Luc Ducalcon.

Honours

Club 
 Castres
Top 14: 2017–18

References

External links
France profile at FFR

1987 births
Free State Cheetahs players
ASM Clermont Auvergne players
French rugby union players
South African rugby union players
South African emigrants to France
Living people
France international rugby union players
Rugby union props
Rugby union players from the Free State (province)